The 1970 McNeese State Cowboys football team was an American football team that represented McNeese State University as a member of the Gulf States Conference (GSC) during the 1970 NCAA College Division football season. In their first year under head coach Jack Doland, the team compiled an overall record of 5–6 with a mark of 2–3 in conference play, and finished tied for fourth in the GSC.

Schedule

References

McNeese State
McNeese Cowboys football seasons
McNeese State Cowboys football